Kapong is a district (amphoe) in Phang Nga province in south Thailand.

Geography
Neighboring districts are (from the north clockwise): Phanom of Surat Thani province; Mueang Phang Nga, Thai Mueang, and Takua Pa.

The forests of the district are part of Khao Lak-Lam Ru National Park.

The district's highest point, in Le Subdistrict, is Phu Ta Jo, signposted to be 1,300 m in elevation. Its summit and slopes were the sites of tin mines until being closed decades ago.

History
The district is named after Khlong Kapong, a natural canal that runs through the area. It is still very natural, some parts are forested and some parts cultivated.

Originally, Kapong was considered part of Takua Pa or Takola. In the past, it was a trading port frequented by Indian traders. After the discovery of mineral deposits the district grew and was promoted to a full district in 1896–1897.

Administration 
Kapong district is divided into five sub-districts (tambons), which are further subdivided into 22 villages (mubans). Tha Na has township (thesaban tambon) status and covers parts of tambon Tha Na. There are four tambon administrative organizations (TAO). Tambon Kapong is administered by a neighboring tambon.

Places
Pracha Uthit Bridge: a bridge over Khlong Kapong, a landmark of Kapong.

In literature and film
The district is the setting for the semi-autobiographical short stories of Ajin Panjapan about the four years, from 1949–1953, he worked there on a tin mining dredge. The stories were converted to film in the 2005 Thai movie, The Tin Mine (Maha'lai muang rae), directed by Jira Maligool.

References

External links
amphoe.com (Thai)
Tourist attractions in the district at the Phang Nga province website

Kapong